, mononymously known by her ring name Himeka is a Japanese professional wrestler currently signed to the Japanese professional wrestling promotion World Wonder Ring Stardom.

Professional wrestling career

Independent circuit (2017-present)
Before signing with Stardom, Arita worked as a freelancer for various promotions. She made her professional wrestling debut in Actwres girl'Z, at AgZ Act 26, an event which took place on December 23, 2017 where she teamed up with Kakeru Sekiguchi and Miyuki Takase to face Nao Kakuta, Saori Anou and Tae Honma in a six-woman tag team match. She unsuccessfully challenged Takase for the vacant AgZ Championship at AgZ in Korakuen Hall on November 6, 2019. Arita once competed for All Japan Pro Wrestling, at AJPW GROWIN' UP Vol.10 on January 25, 2018 where she fell short to Natsumi Maki. At Ice Ribbon New Ice Ribbon #951 on March 31, 2019, Arita teamed up with Hiragi Kurumi in a losing effort to Akane Fujita and Risa Sera in a hardcore tag team match. At Oz Academy Come Back To Shima!, an event promoted on May 26, 2019, Arita competed in a battle royal also involving Mika Akino, Hiroyo Matsumoto, Sonoko Kato, Yoshiko and others.

New Japan Pro Wrestling (2021)
Arita worked in an exhibition match for New Japan Pro Wrestling on January 5, 2021, in the second night of Wrestle Kingdom 15, where she teamed up with Natsupoi and Maika in a losing effort to Queen's Quest's (AZM, Saya Kamitani and Utami Hayashishita).

Pro Wrestling Wave (2018-2020)
On April 22, 2018, Arita made her debut in Pro Wrestling Wave at WAVE Young Vol. 38 ~ Mika Iida Retirement Special in Shin-Kiba 1st Ring where she teamed up with Fairy Nihonbashi and Moeka Haruhi in a losing effort to Akane Fujita, Rina Yamashita and Rin Kadokura. She took part of the Catch the Wave tournament of 2019, placing herself in the "Visual Block" and scoring one point after competing against Nagisa Nozaki, Hikaru Shida and Yumi Ohka. One of the notable matches in which she wrestled was at the WAVE 12th Anniversary on August 12, 2019, where she teamed up with Miyuki Takase as The Beginning and unsuccessfully challenged Sakura Hirota and Yuki Miyazaki for the Wave Tag Team Championship.

World Wonder Ring Stardom (2020-present)
Arita debuted in Stardom on June 21, 2020, at Stardom FC My Stardom ~ Stardom Is Again! as a mystery member for Giulia, Syuri and Maika, with whom she teamed up to defeat Stars (Mayu Iwatani, Tam Nakano, Starlight Kid and Saya Iida). She was revealed to be the newest recruit of the Donna Del Mondo stable led by Giulia. She took part in the 5STAR Grand Prix 2020, scoring a total of eleven points after competing against Tam Nakano, fellow stablemate Giulia, Starlight Kid, Saya Kamitani, Death yama-san, Mayu Iwatani and Konami. She fell short to Utami Hayashishita on the finals from September 19. At the 2020 edition of the Goddesses of Stardom Tag League, Arita teamed up with her fellow stablemate Syuri under the pseudonym "Grab The Top", placing themselves in the "Blue Goddess Block", and scoring a total of six points after competing against the teams of MOMOAZ (Momo Watanabe and AZM, Black Widows (Natsuko Tora and Saki Kashima), Stars (Tam Nakano and Mina Shirakawa), and Color Me Pop (Riho and Gokigen Death).

On the second night of the Stardom Go To Budokan! Valentine Special from February 14, 2021, Arita teamed up with Maika to defeat Oedo Tai's Bea Priestley and Konami for the Goddess of Stardom Championship. At the 10th Anniversary of Stardom on March 3, 2021, Maika and Himeka defeated Natsuko Tora and Saki Kashima to retain the titles. One month later at Stardom Yokohama Dream Cinderella 2021 on April 4, they would lose the titles to fellow stablemates Giulia and Syuri with no further altercations occurring after the match. At the Stardom Cinderella Tournament 2021, Arita defeated Hanan in a first-round match on April 10 and Mayu Iwatani in the quarter-finals from May 14, but fell short to Saya Kamitani in the semi-finals which took place on June 12.

On February 10, 2023 Arita announced her retirement from professional wrestling in May.

Championships and accomplishments
World Wonder Ring Stardom
Goddess of Stardom Championship (1 time) – with Maika
Artist of Stardom Championship (1 time) – with Maika and Natsupoi
 5★Star GP Award (1 time)
 5★Star GP Best Match Award (2022) – 
 Stardom Year-End Award (1 time)
 Best Unit Award (2020) – 
 Seadlinnng
 Beyond the Sea Tag Team Championship (1 time) – with Miyuki Takase

References 

1997 births
Living people
Japanese female professional wrestlers
21st-century professional wrestlers
Goddess of Stardom Champions
Artist of Stardom Champions